The Arena Leipzig is a multipurpose indoor arena located in Leipzig, Germany. The capacity of the arena is 8,000 people for sporting events and up to 12,200 for shows and concerts. It is part of the Sportforum Leipzig, which also contains Red Bull Arena and the Sportmuseum Leipzig.

Structure
The main hall has retractable stands and has depending on its configuration a size from 2,400 to 4,656 square meters. The height of the hall is between 12 and 20 meters. A 200-meter track can be retracted for concerts and shows.

Sports
It is currently the home venue of HC Leipzig, a German handball team.

It hosted the 2015 Men's and Women's Indoor Hockey World Cup, and 2017 World Fencing Championships.

Other uses
The arena is frequently used by national and international artists for concerts and shows. Artists who have performed at this venue include:

A-ha, Alice Cooper, Anastacia, Apocalyptica, Backstreet Boys, Beatsteaks, Bob Dylan, Britney Spears, Cher, Coldplay, David Garrett, Deep Purple, Eric Clapton, George Michael, Gossip, Iron Maiden, James Blunt, Journey, Judas Priest, Justin Timberlake, Kiss, Kylie Minogue, Lord of the Dance, Loreena McKennitt, Mando Diao, Metallica, Mark Knopfler, Neil Young, NKOTBSB, Pink, Placebo, Queen with Paul Rodgers, Rammstein, Rihanna, Rise Against, Robin Gibb, Roger Waters, Sabaton, Sade, Scorpions, Shakira, Sting, Whitney Houston, ZZ Top and Soy Luna Live.

See also
List of indoor arenas in Germany

References

External links

Arena Leipzig website

Handball venues in Germany
Indoor ice hockey venues in Germany
Basketball venues in Germany
Indoor track and field venues
Sport in Leipzig
Buildings and structures in Leipzig
Sports venues in Saxony
Indoor arenas in Germany
2002 establishments in Germany
Sports venues completed in 2002